Gregory Booth (born 28 August 1951) is a former Australian rules footballer, who played for the Fitzroy Football Club in the Victorian Football League (VFL).

References

External links

Fitzroy Football Club players
Australian rules footballers from Victoria (Australia)
1951 births
Living people